Barkhagen is a municipality in the Ludwigslust-Parchim district, in Mecklenburg-Vorpommern, Germany.

It includes the districts of Altenlinden, Barkow (Barkhagen), Kolonie Lalchow, Plauerhagen, Zarchlin and Lage.

References

Ludwigslust-Parchim